The following is a partial list of the "C" codes for Medical Subject Headings (MeSH), as defined by the United States National Library of Medicine (NLM).

This list continues the information at List of MeSH codes (C08). Codes following these are found at List of MeSH codes (C10). For other MeSH codes, see List of MeSH codes.

The source for this content is the set of 2006 MeSH Trees from the NLM.

– otorhinolaryngologic diseases

– ciliary motility disorders

– kartagener syndrome

– ear diseases

– cholesteatoma, middle ear

– ear deformities, acquired

– ear neoplasms

– earache

– hearing disorders
  – hearing loss
  – deafness
  – hearing loss, bilateral
  – hearing loss, conductive
  – hearing loss, functional
  – hearing loss, high-frequency
  – hearing loss, mixed conductive-sensorineural
  – hearing loss, sensorineural
  – hearing loss, central
  – hearing loss, noise-induced
  – presbycusis
  – usher syndromes
  – hearing loss, sudden
  – hearing loss, unilateral
  – hyperacusis
  – tinnitus

– herpes zoster oticus

– labyrinth diseases
  – cochlear diseases
  – endolymphatic hydrops
  – Ménière's disease
  – labyrinthitis
  – vestibular diseases
  – vertigo

– otitis
  – otitis externa
  – otitis media
  – mastoiditis
  – otitis media with effusion
  – otitis media, suppurative

– otosclerosis

– retrocochlear diseases
  – auditory diseases, central
  – auditory perceptual disorders
  – hearing loss, central
  – vestibulocochlear nerve diseases
  – neuroma, acoustic
  – neurofibromatosis 2
  – vestibular neuronitis

– tympanic membrane perforation

– laryngeal diseases

– granuloma, laryngeal

– laryngeal edema

– laryngeal neoplasms

– laryngismus

– laryngitis
  – croup

– laryngostenosis

– tuberculosis, laryngeal

– vocal cord paralysis

– voice disorders
  – aphonia
  – hoarseness

– nose diseases

– choanal atresia

– epistaxis

– granuloma, lethal midline

– nasal obstruction

– nasal polyps

– nose deformities, acquired

– nose neoplasms
  – paranasal sinus neoplasms
  – maxillary sinus neoplasms

– paranasal sinus diseases
  – paranasal sinus neoplasms
  – maxillary sinus neoplasms
  – sinusitis
  – ethmoid sinusitis
  – frontal sinusitis
  – maxillary sinusitis
  – sphenoid sinusitis

– rhinitis
  – rhinitis, allergic, perennial
  – rhinitis, allergic, seasonal
  – rhinitis, atrophic
  – rhinitis, vasomotor

– rhinoscleroma

– otorhinolaryngologic neoplasms

– ear neoplasms

– laryngeal neoplasms

– neuroma, acoustic
  – neurofibromatosis 2

– nose neoplasms
  – paranasal sinus neoplasms
  – maxillary sinus neoplasms

– pharyngeal neoplasms
  – hypopharyngeal neoplasms
  – nasopharyngeal neoplasms
  – oropharyngeal neoplasms
  – tonsillar neoplasms

– pharyngeal diseases

– deglutition disorders

– nasopharyngeal diseases
  – nasopharyngeal neoplasms
  – nasopharyngitis

– peritonsillar abscess

– pharyngeal neoplasms
  – hypopharyngeal neoplasms
  – nasopharyngeal neoplasms
  – oropharyngeal neoplasms
  – tonsillar neoplasms

– pharyngitis

– retropharyngeal abscess

– tonsillitis

– velopharyngeal insufficiency

The list continues at List of MeSH codes (C10).

C09